Fellow of the Linguistic Society of America (LSA) is an honor accorded by the Linguistic Society of America (LSA) to distinguished members of the society. LSA Fellows are "members of the Society who have made distinguished contributions to the discipline" and are selected annually by the LSA Executive Committee based on nominations from the general society membership.

The LSA first made the award in 2006. Distinguished contributions suitable for being named an LSA Fellow include scholarly excellence, service to the LSA, service to language communities, service to government, nonprofit organizations and/or industry, teaching and mentoring excellence, and sustained effort in the above areas over the course of their careers.

LSA Fellows

LSA Fellows include many notable linguists, such as Anne H. Charity Hudley, Sonja Lanehart, John Baugh, Diane Brentari, Claire Bowern, Mark Baker and John Rickford.

References

 
Science and technology awards
American awards
Linguistic Society of America
Linguistic Society of America